The Toga Dam is a gravity dam on the Togagawa River (a tributary of the Shō River) near Omaki village about  southeast of Shogawa in Toyama Prefecture, Japan. It was constructed between 1941 and 1943. The dam diverts water to the 17.6 MW Omaki hydroelectric power station  to the west on the Shō River. It was commissioned in 1944.

See also

Komaki Dam – downstream on the Shō River
Senzoku Dam – upstream

References

Dams in Toyama Prefecture
Gravity dams
Dams completed in 1943
Dams on the Shō River
Hydroelectric power stations in Japan